Kathleen Sullivan Connell (born May 24, 1937) is an American former politician from the state of Rhode Island. She was the Secretary of State of Rhode Island between 1987 and 1993.

Early life 
Connell was born on May 24, 1937, in Newport, Rhode Island. Her parents were Laurence Sullivan and Margaret Sullivan (née Brynes). She attended St. Mary’s School and St. Catherine Academy. She received a bachelors of science degree in nursing from Salve Regina College in 1958, graduating magna cum laude. She completed graduate studies at Boston College, the University of Rhode Island and Rhode Island College. She married Gerald Connell in 1960 and the couple had three children: Laurence, Margaret and Kathleen. Connell worked as a registered nurse from 1970 to 1986.

Political career 
Connell was a delegate at the 1984 Democratic National Convention and the following year, she was appointed to the Democratic National Committee and became a member of the Women's Democratic Caucus. She started her political career as a member of the Middletown, Rhode Island school committee, where she served for 13 years, and the Middletown town council. She served one term in the Rhode Island Senate in the 48th district, being elected in 1983 and serving until 1984, before running for Secretary of State.

She was the Secretary of State of Rhode Island between 1987 and 1993. During her State Office position, one of her most noteworthy achievements was saving historical records in the Rhode Island state capitol's basement. After leaving office, she worked as the Rhode Island Director of AARP. Connell was inducted into the Rhode Island Heritage Hall of Fame in 2010, and is a 2013 recipient of the Isabelle Ahearn O'Neill Award.

References

External links
Guide to Office of the Secretary of State Kathleen S. Connell records from the Rhode Island State Archives

1937 births
Democratic Party Rhode Island state senators
Secretaries of State of Rhode Island
Women state legislators in Rhode Island
Living people
20th-century American politicians
20th-century American women politicians
21st-century American women